Lee Che-gyong (born January 19, 1989), better known by his ring name , is a Zainichi-Korean professional wrestler, former mixed martial artist as well as former weightlifter. He is currently signed to Pro Wrestling Noah, where he is the GHC Heavyweight Champion in his first reign.

Professional wrestling career

All Japan Pro Wrestling

Early career and retirement (2011)
Lee joined the All Japan Pro Wrestling dojo in January 2011, initially training under Keiji Mutoh. He debuted on August 17 of that year using his real name in a loss to Taiyo Kea, and lost again the following day, this time to Ryota Hama, but on August 20, Gyong picked up his first victory with a win over Yasufumi Nakanoue, and was once again victorious on August 24, teaming with Akebono and Masakatsu Funaki to defeat Joe Doering, Mazada and René Dupree. Gyong represented AJPW in The Destroyer Cup Battle Royal at All Together 2011, eventually won by Kentaro Shiga.

Gyong teamed with Takumi Soya on September 11 to defeat Soshun and Yasufumi Nakanoue, but was defeated by Soya and Takao Omori on September 17 when he teamed with Manabu Soya. After sustaining an injury, Gyong announced his retirement from professional wrestling in October 2011 after just ten professional matches. Gyong said in a 2016 interview that leaving professional wrestling "broke his heart". After leaving professional wrestling, he began to pursue a career in mixed martial arts. Soon after leaving All Japan, Gyong joined Power Of Dreams, where he trained under Kenichi Yamamoto and competed in MMA for the next several years.

Return and Nextream (2015–2017)
Gyong announced his return to professional wrestling and AJPW on May 21, 2015, now going under the ring name Jake Lee. His first match back took place on June 4, when he teamed with Jun Akiyama to defeat Takao Omori and Naoya Nomura. In December, after Kento Miyahara tried to join Evolution but was rejected by Suwama, Miyahara announced the formation of a new unit known as Nextream, consisting initially of Miyahara and Lee. On January 21, Nextream defeated Jun Akiyama and Yuma Aoyagi, and on February 13 defeated Akiyama and Takao Omori to become the new #1 contenders to the World Tag Team Championship. Lee and Miyahara unsuccessfully challenged champions Zeus and The Bodyguard on February 21. In April, Lee participated in the 2016 Champion Carnival, finishing with 2 points. On August 6, Miyahara and Lee received another opportunity at the World Tag Team Championships, this time losing to Daisuke Sekimoto and Yuji Okabayashi.

Lee took part in the 2016 Royal Road Tournament, but was eliminated in the first round by Ryoji Sai. In October, Miyahara and Lee were joined in Nextream by Yuma Aoyagi, and eventually Naoya Nomura. On October 31, Lee represented AJPW in an 8-man tag team match for Heat-Up Pro Wrestling, teaming with Takao Omori, Yuma Aoyagi and Yohei Nakajima to defeat Daisuke Kanehira, Koji Iwamoto, Shinya Ishida and Tatsumi Fujinami.

Lee and Miyahara participated in the 2016 Real World Tag League, winning their block with 8 points, but losing to Get Wild (Takao Omori and Manabu Soya) in the final. On February 17, 2017, Lee teamed with Miyahara to once again challenge Big Guns for the World Tag Team Championship but again came up short.

In April, Lee participated in the 2017 Champion Carnival but finished last in Block A with 2 points only scoring a win over Zeus. Following the Champion Carnival, Lee began teaming with Nextream member Naoya Nomura and the two challenged The Big Guns for the World Tag Titles on May 12 but lost.

On June 11, Lee got his first shot at the Triple Crown Heavyweight Championship against Shuji Ishikawa but came up short. On July 17, Lee and Nomura got another title shot against The Big Guns for the World Tag Team Championship but this time emerged victorious with both Lee and Nomura winning their first championship. On July 28, Lee and Nomura retained the titles in a rematch against The Big Guns but Lee suffered a knee injury during the match. On August 1, AJPW announced Lee and Nomura were stripped of the titles due to Lee's injury.

Sweeper (2018–2019) 
In the spring of 2018, Lee announced his return to the ring as well as his departure from Nextream. He had his return match on May 24 teaming with Koji Iwamoto to defeat Nomura and Yoshitatsu. On June 13, Lee announced the formation of his own stable called "Sweeper" due to their desire to clean sweep All Japan by controlling their titles with the stable consisting of Iwamoto, Keiichi Sato, Ryoji Sai, and Dylan James.

In September, Lee entered the Ōdō Tournament defeating Jun Akiyama in the first round on September 17 but fell to Kento Miyahara in the second round on September 22.

On September 24, James turned on Lee during a tag team match, forming a tag team with Joe Doering. From November to December, Lee entered the 2018 World's Strongest Tag Determination League teaming with Sai but finished 9th place with 8 points scoring wins over Tajiri & Gianni Valletta, Violence Giants (Suwama & Shuji Ishikawa), Jun Akiyama & Daisuke Sekimoto, and Kai & Kengo Mashimo.

On January 2, 2019, Lee won the January 2nd Openweight Korakuen Hall Battle Royal. On February 24, Lee teamed with Sai to challenge Strong BJ (Daisuke Sekimoto and Yuji Okabayashi) for the World Tag Team Championship but lost. On March 21, Lee teamed with Iwamoto to compete in a four team tournament for the vacant All Asia Tag Team Championships which they ended up winning by defeating Big Japan Pro Wrestling's Masaya Takahashi and Takayuki Ueki in the semifinals and Daichi Hashimoto and Hideyoshi Kamitani in the finals.

In April, Lee entered the 2019 Champion Carnival and tied for first place in Block B with Naoya Nomura with 10 points. Due to this, Lee defeated Nomura in a finalist decision match to advance to the finals where he lost to Triple Crown Champion Kento Miyahara. On May 5, at BJW Endless Survivor, Lee and Iwamoto lost the All Asia Tag Team Championships to Ryuichi Kawakami and Kazumi Kikuta, before regaining the titles on June 18. On September 23, Lee won his first major single accolade when he defeated Kento Miyahara to win the 2019 Ōdō Tournament. Lee would go on to lose his rematch with Miyahara on October 24 for the Triple Crown Championship.  On October 10, Lee and Naoya Nomura announced their entry into the 2019 World Strongest Tag Determination League, to which Iwamoto questioned the reason for Sweepers existence. During the tournament, Lee would announce the dissolution of Sweeper and finished the tournament as runner up to Suwama and Shuji Ishikawa.

Jin (2019–2021) 
On December 21, Lee, Iwamoto and Nomura officially formed the stable Jin (stylised in all caps). On January 3, 2020, Lee once again unsuccessfully challenged Kento Miyahara for the Triple Crown Championship. In March, Lee entered BJW's Ikkitousen Strong Climb and won three of his four matches. On March 23, Lee and Iwamoto lost the All Asia Tag Team Championships to Yankee Two Kenju (Isami Kodaka and Yuko Miyamoto. Due to the COVID-19 pandemic, several events scheduled to showcase the Ikkitousen Strong Climb were cancelled and all remaining matches were adjudged as draws, allowing Lee to progress to the semi-finals. On April 26, Lee lost to Quiet Storm via count-out. He participated in 2020's Champion Carnival and Real World Tag League with Iwamoto but was unsuccessful in both tournaments. On February 23, 2021, during a six man tag team match against Enfants Terribles, the members of the stable turned on Shotaro Ashino. In the post match beatdown, Lee also attacked Ashino and turned on stablemate Iwamoto with the five men leaving together.

Total Eclipse (2021–2022) 
On March 6, Lee, alongside, Hokuto Omori, Koji Doi, Kuma Arashi, Yusuke Kodama and Tajiri, debuted as Total Eclipse. They defeated Ashino, Iwamoto, Dan Tamura, Hikaru Sato and Suwama in a ten man tag team elimination match which didn't include Arashi.

Personal life
Lee became a vegan while training for MMA and obtained a teacher's licence in college. He also is an active personal fitness trainer, and has trained the Japanese musician Maki Ohguro.

Championships and accomplishments
All Japan Pro Wrestling
 Triple Crown Heavyweight Championship (2 times)
All Asia Tag Team Championship (2 times) – with Koji Iwamoto
World Tag Team Championship (1 time) – with Naoya Nomura
Champion Carnival (2021)
Nemuro Shokudō Cup 6-Man Tag Tournament (2017) – with Kento Miyahara and Yuma Aoyagi
Royal Road Tournament (2019)
New Year Openweight Battle Royal (2019)
All Asia Tag Team Championship Tournament (2019) – with Koji Iwamoto
Pro Wrestling Illustrated
 Ranked No. 34 of the top 500 singles wrestlers in the PWI 500 in 2022
Pro Wrestling Noah
 GHC Heavyweight Championship (1 time, current)
Tokyo Sports
Outstanding Performance Award (2021)

References

External links 
 
 

1989 births
Living people
People from Kitami, Hokkaido
Japanese male professional wrestlers
Japanese male mixed martial artists
Mixed martial artists utilizing wrestling
Zainichi Korean people
Exercise instructors
Japanese male weightlifters
All Asia Tag Team Champions
World Tag Team Champions (AJPW)
Triple Crown Heavyweight Champions